The 2020 Popular Democratic Party primaries was the primary elections by which voters of the Popular Democratic Party (PPD) chose its nominees for various political offices of Puerto Rico for 2020. The primaries, originally scheduled for June 2020, were delayed until August 9, 2020, due to the COVID-19 pandemic. The August 9 elections, however, were marred by a lack of ballots leading a suspension of the election; polling locations that could not open on August 9 were scheduled to be open for voting on August 16. The winner for the party's nomination for Governor of Puerto Rico is Charlie Delgado, mayor of Isabela, over Carmen Yulín Cruz, mayor of San Juan and Eduardo Bhatia, Minority Leader of the Puerto Rico Senate.

Candidates

Governor
 Carlos Delgado Altieri, mayor of Isabela
 Eduardo Bhatia, Minority Leader of the Puerto Rico Senate
 Carmen Yulín Cruz, mayor of San Juan, and former member of the Puerto Rico House of Representatives

Resident Commissioner
 Aníbal Acevedo Vilá, former Resident Commissioner of Puerto Rico and former Governor of Puerto Rico

Senate
In the Senate of Puerto Rico, the PPD holds 3 at-large seats and 1 district seat. The PPD also holds 3 additional seats that are temporarily added under Article Three of the Constitution of Puerto Rico whenever the majority party (in this case the New Progressive Party) wins more than two thirds of the original 27 seats in contention.

House of Representatives
The PPD holds 15 seats in the House of Representatives of Puerto Rico.

See also
 2020 New Progressive Party of Puerto Rico primaries

References

External links
 Comisión Estatal de Elecciones

Primary elections in Puerto Rico
PPD
Popular Democratic Party (Puerto Rico)